Thierry Amar is a Canadian musician, engineer and producer. He is a member of Godspeed You! Black Emperor, Thee Silver Mt. Zion Memorial Orchestra & Tra-La-La Band, Earthquake Architecture, The Craig Pedersen Quartet and Black Ox Orkestar.

He is co-founder/creator of Hotel2Tango.

Career
Amar joined Godspeed You! Black Emperor around the time of its debut album, F♯ A♯ ∞. He, with Mauro Pezzente, plays the electric bass in the group. When playing with Thee Silver Mt. Zion Memorial Orchestra & Tra-La-La Band or Black Ox Orkestar, he usually plays double bass. He also played violin on the EP The "Pretty Little Lightning Paw" E.P..

Amar is also a singer for Thee Silver Mt. Zion Memorial Orchestra & Tra-La-La Band, which shares vocals with all of its band members.

Along with Howard Bilerman, Efrim Menuck and Radwan Moumneh, Amar owns and operates the Hotel2Tango. Once a living space, it is now a professional recording studio, practice area, and live performance venue. 

In 2006, Amar, with Efrim Menuck and Sophie Trudeau, assisted in the recording of Carla Bozulich's first release for Constellation, Evangelista.

Discography

with Godspeed You! Black Emperor
F♯ A♯ ∞ (1998)
Slow Riot for New Zero Kanada (1999)
Lift Your Skinny Fists Like Antennas to Heaven (2000)
Yanqui U.X.O. (2002)
'Allelujah! Don't Bend! Ascend! (2012)
Asunder, Sweet and Other Distress (2015)
Luciferian Towers (2017)
G_d's Pee at State's End! (2021)

with A Silver Mt. Zion
He Has Left Us Alone but Shafts of Light Sometimes Grace the Corner of Our Rooms... (2000)
Born into Trouble as the Sparks Fly Upward (2001)
"This Is Our Punk-Rock," Thee Rusted Satellites Gather + Sing,, (2003)
The "Pretty Little Lightning Paw" E.P. (2004)
Horses in the Sky (2005)
13 Blues for Thirteen Moons (2008)
Kollaps Tradixionales (2010)
Hang On to Each Other (2014)

with Black Ox Orkestar
Ver Tanzt? (2004)
Nisht Azoy (2006)

References

External links
Constellation Records Official Homepage
Hotel2Tango Official Homepage

Year of birth missing (living people)
Living people
Canadian rock singers
Canadian rock bass guitarists
20th-century Canadian bass guitarists
20th-century Canadian male singers
Godspeed You! Black Emperor members
Thee Silver Mt. Zion members
Musicians from Montreal